Berkeh-ye Sefid (also Romanized as Berkeh-ye Sefīd) is a village in Alamarvdasht Rural District, Alamarvdasht District, Lamerd County, Fars Province, Iran. At the 2006 census, its population was 91, in 15 families.

References 

Populated places in Lamerd County